The Hyderabad Metro is a rapid transit system, serving the city of Hyderabad, Telangana, India.  It is the second longest operational metro network in India after the Delhi Metro (285 stations) with 57 stations and the lines are arranged in a secant model. It is funded by a public–private partnership (PPP), with the state government holding a minority equity stake. A special purpose vehicle company, L&T Metro Rail Hyderabad Ltd (L&TMRHL), was established by the construction company L&T to develop the Hyderabad metro rail project. 

A  stretch from Miyapur to Nagole, with 24 stations, was inaugurated on 28 November 2017 by Prime Minister Narendra Modi. This was the longest rapid transit metro line opened in one go in India. It is estimated to cost . As of February 2020, about 490,000 people use the Metro per day. Trains are crowded during the morning and evening rush hours. A ladies only coach was introduced on all the trains from 7 May 2018. Post-COVID, 450,000 average daily passengers were travelling on Hyderabad Metro by December 2022.

History 

Metro Rail Project was approved by Union government, in 2003. As Hyderabad continued to grow, the Multi-Modal Transport System (MMTS) had insufficient capacity for public transport, and the Union Ministry of Urban Development approved construction of the Hyderabad Metro Rail Project, directing the Delhi Metro Rail Corporation to conduct a survey of the proposed lines and to submit a Detailed Project Report (DPR). To meet rising public transport needs and mitigate growing road traffic in the twin cities of Hyderabad and Secunderabad, the state government and the South Central Railway jointly launched the MMTS in August 2003. The initial plan was for the Metro to connect with the existing MMTS to provide commuters with alternate modes of transport. Simultaneously, the proposals for taking up the construction of MMTS Phase II were also taken forward.

In 2007, N. V. S. Reddy was appointed Managing Director of Hyderabad Metro Rail Limited, and the same year, Central Government approved financial assistance of  1639 crore under a Viability Gap Funding (VGF) scheme. The option of an underground metro system in Hyderabad was ruled out by L&T due to the presence of hard rocks, boulders and the topography of the soil in Hyderabad. Hyderabad Metro initially began under the Andhra Pradesh Municipal Tramways (Construction, Operation and Maintenance) Act, 2008 and later on, it came under the Central Metro Act which permitted revision of fares. On 26 March 2018, the Government of Telangana announced that it would set up an SPV "Hyderabad Airport Metro Limited (HAML)", jointly promoted by HMRL and HMDA, to extend the Blue line from Raidurg to Rajiv Gandhi International Airport, Shamshabad, under Phase II after the completion of Phase I in 2020.

Initial bidding
The bidding process was completed by July 2008 and awarded to Maytas, which failed to achieve financial closure for the project as per schedule by March 2009.

Re-bidding 
The State government cancelled the contract and called for a fresh rebidding for the project. In the July 2010 rebidding process, Larsen & Toubro (L&T) emerged as the lowest bidder for the  project. The Nallari Kiran Kumar Reddy government proactively pursued the project, but it was delayed due to separate state agitation and later due to the apprehensions of the new government.

Mascot 

The mascot of Hyderabad Metro Rail is Niz. It was derived from the word Nizam, who ruled the princely state of Hyderabad.

Construction milestones 

 Groundbreaking (Bhoomi Puja) for the project was conducted on 26 April 2012 the concessionaire started the pillar erection on the same day for Stage-I  and on 6 June 2012 for Stage-II. The work for Corridor 2 has been delayed due to traders in Koti and Sultan Bazar demanding realignment of the route to safeguard traders and old age heritage markets. If the recent bill proposed in Parliament which allows construction within a  radius of heritage structures and sites of historical or archaeological importance is passed, Metro might receive a chance as it helps to connect the Old city with IT corridor.
 The construction of the entire  has been split into 6 stages with the first stage originally scheduled to be completed by March 2015
 The first highly sophisticated train of the Hyderabad Metro Rail (HMR) came from Korea during the third week of May 2014. Stringent trial runs commenced from June 2014 till February 2015. The trial runs started on the Miyapur to Sanjeeva Reddy Nagar stretch in October 2015.

 CMRS inspection for Stage-II (Miyapur and S.R.Nagar Section) was done on 9, 10 August 2016.
 The steel bridge of the HMR was successfully placed over the Oliphant bridge in August 2017.
 In November 2017,  Commissioner of Railway Safety (CMRS) granted safety approval for  stretch from Miyapur to SR Nagar,  stretch from SR Nagar to Mettuguda and  stretch from Nagole to Mettuguda.
 16-km Ameerpet - LB Nagar Metro stretch was opened for commercial operations from 24 September 2018.
 The Ameerpet - HITEC City route was opened on conditional basis on 20 March 2019. The reversal facility after HITEC City metro station was started on 20 August 2019. 
 On 19 May 2019, the construction of all the 2,599 pillars for the  Hyderabad Metro rail (except the  stretch in old city) was completed.
 The Green Line Corridor from Jubilee Bus Station to Mahatma Gandhi Bus Station was issued the Safety Certificate by the Commissioner of Metro Rail Safety and inauguration of services on the section was done on 7 February 2020 by the Chief Minister of Telangana, K. Chandrashekar Rao.
 Groundbreaking ceremony for Airport Express line was done by Chief Minister of Telangana, K. Chandrashekar Rao on 9th of December 2022

Network

Currently, the Hyderabad Metro has 56 stations. Phase I of the Hyderabad metro has 64 stations; they have escalators and elevators to reach the stations, announcement boards and electronic display systems. The stations also have service roads underneath them to for other public transportation systems to drop-off and pick-up passengers. The signboards of Hyderabad Metro are displayed in Telugu, English, Hindi and Urdu at metro stations. All stations of Hyderabad Metro Rail are equipped with tactile pathway right from street level till the platform level along with elevator buttons equipped with Braille, for providing a barrier less navigation for the visually impaired commuters.

Otis Elevator Company supplied and maintains the 670 elevators in use on the system.  The numbering of metro pillars of Hyderabad Metro is alpha-numeric with corridor I (Miyapur-LB Nagar) designated as ‘A’, corridor II (JBS-Falaknuma) designated as ‘B’ and corridor III (Nagole-Raidurg) designated as ‘C’. The numbering begins from the Point of Beginning (POB) corridor-wise like the pier numbers on corridor I is C1 near Nagole bridge (corridor beginning), C296 near Mettuguda, C583 near Begumpet, C623 near Ameerpet, C1001 near Hitec city, and C1052 near Riadurg.  Any future expansion of corridors would be having D, E, F etc. The  metro Rail pillars are linked them with Google Maps and GPS (Global Position System).

In May 2018, L&T Metro Rail signed a contract with Powergrid Corporation of India to install electric vehicle charging facilities at all metro stations beginning with Miyapur and Dr. B R Ambedkar Balanagar stations. L&THMRL has set up free wifi access units for commuters at Miyapur, Ameerpet and Nagole metro stations, in association with ACT Fibernet, as part of a pilot project. In April 2019, K. T. Rama Rao said that  of metro rail was planned for Hyderabad, with metro along entire Outer Ring Road. All metro corridors are scheduled to terminate at Shamshabad, near Rajiv Gandhi International Airport, as planned in Hyderabad Metro Rail Phase-II. In August 2019, KT Rama Rao said that state cabinet has approved the Hyderabad Metro Airport Express Link from Raidurg to the airport.

Current status

Construction phases

The construction work was undertaken in two phases. There are six stages of completion in Phase I.

Phase I

The metro rail line between Nagole and Secunderabad was originally scheduled open by December 2015; it was partly opened on 29 November 2017 and the entire  phase 1 completed in 2020. Earlier in 2010, All India Majlis-e-Ittehadul Muslimeen suggested an alternate route for metro in the old city through Purana pul, Muslimjung, Bahadurpura, Zoo Park, Tadbun junction, Kalapathar, Misrigunj and Shamsheergunj to Falaknuma. However, this  route was not accepted. The eastern parts of the old city have access to the metro via the Malakpet metro station. A -long green line in the old city  will pass through Dar-ul-Shifa, Salar Jung Museum, Charminar, Shah-Ali-Banda , Shamsheer Gunj , Jungametta  and ends at Falaknuma. In June 2022, Hyderabad Metro Rail started a fresh survey of the Old City route from MGBS for underground utilities. The survey is through the Lidar, Global Positioning System and Inertial measurement unit and the plan is to build the elevated line alongside Musi river and centre of the road.

 Line 1 - Red Line - Miyapur–LB Nagar -    27 stations
 Line 2 - Green Line - JBS–Falaknuma   15 stations
 Line 3 - Blue Line - Nagole–Raidurg -    24 stations

Note: Stage 4/2 MGBS–Falaknuma section is also part of the initial phase I, but has been rumored that the state government might take up this section instead of L&T, but will be completed along with the phase I work. The Stage 3/2 HITEC City–Raidurg section of Corridor III was not initial part of phase I, it was later on added by the newly elected state government. This section is opened on 29 November 2019.

Phase II
The Government is planning second phase of metro rail extending further. The construction of Phase II will be taken up solely by the state government, instead of public–private partnership (PPP) mode in Phase I.  Delhi Metro Rail Corporation (DMRC) was entrusted to give a detailed project report (DPR) for Phase II. In February 2020, Hyderabad Metro MD NVS Reddy said that three corridors are considered for phase 2. The DPR has been submitted to state government. 

In November 2022, Telangana government asked the Central Government to sanction the metro rail Phase-II, to be jointly owned by Telangana and the Centre (on the lines of MMTS) with external financial assistance. Telangana government proposed metro rail connectivity for about 26 km from BHEL to Lakdikapul with 23 stations and extension of other stretch from Nagole to LB Nagar covering a distance of about 5 kms with 4 stations. BHEL-Lakdikapul metro rail corridor is expected to pass through Miyapur, Raidurg, Khajaguda Junction, Mehdipatnam, Tolichowki and Masab tank areas. Telanagana Government has asked Central Government to sanction  for metro works in the upcoming union budget for 2023-24. For implementing the project, detailed project reports (DPRs) have already been prepared by the state government with the help of Delhi Metro Rail Corporation (DMRC). The reports have been sent to the Centre. Also the Hyderabad airport metro limited and HMDA will build an elevated Hyderabad Bus Rapid Transit System between Kokapet neopolis and KPHB Colony metro station covering

Hyderabad Airport Express Metro

On 26 March 2018, a special purpose vehicle company, Hyderabad Airport Metro Limited (HAML), was established by Government of Telangana to develop the Hyderabad Airport Metro Express. 

The  Airport Express Metro Corridor is proposed to have 27-km elevated,  on ground and a -km underground section to connect to the airport terminal. The airport route will have 9 elevated stations and one underground station. From Raidurg Metro terminal station, it will pass through Khajaguda Junction, touching Outer Ring Road at Nanakramguda junction, traverse along ORR to Shamshabad Airport through the existing dedicated Metro Rail Right-of-Way. Chief Minister of Telangana K. Chandrashekar Rao laid the foundation stone for Hyderabad Metro Airport Express on 9 December 2022.

Phase III
In February 2023, K. T. Rama Rao said that BRS government would consider extending the Metro Rail up to Ramoji Film City and other parts of Hyderabad under Phase III, after coming to power for the third consecutive time in the Assembly elections in December 2023.

Lines

Since the first version of the plans, the three corridors mostly remained the same, but minor changes were introduced. These include the lack of stop at Lalaguda, or a stop at Lakdikapul instead of Secretariat. Also, the lines have been marked with several different combination of color. Ameerpet- LB Nagar metro stretch opened on 24 September 2018. HiTec City to Raidurg,  stretch on Corridor Three - Nagole to Raidurg, is opened on 29 November 2019, as it involves construction of 49 pillars and the Raidurg terminal station.

Red Line: Miyapur–L.B. Nagar 

Route length – 
Number of stations (All elevated) – 27
Link to other corridors
At Ameerpet – connecting corridors 1 and 3
At Mahatma Gandhi Bus Station – connecting corridors 1 and 2

Green Line: JBS–Falaknuma 

Route length – 
Number of stations (all elevated) – 16
Link to other corridors
At Mahatma Gandhi Bus Station – connecting corridors 2 and 1

Blue Line: Raidurg-Nagole 

Route length – 
Number of stations (all elevated) – 23
Link to other corridors
At Ameerpet – connecting corridors 3 and 1
At Parade Ground – connecting corridors 3 and 2

Finances

The Hyderabad metro is a Public–private partnership project, the total cost of this transport systems is  3.07 billion which is shared by both Larsen & Toubro (90%)
Government of Telangana (10%). In July 2022, L&T Metro Rail Hyderabad Limited came up with a unique concept of ‘Office Bubbles’ wherein it will offer remote, co-working spaces as part of its Transit-oriented development (ToD). The L&T Hyderabad Metro organisation is offering 1,750 sq. ft. space with two units each in 49 Metro stations across the three corridors and another 5,000-30,000 sq. ft. in eight other Metro stations. Focusing on IT companies, Office Bubbles concept offers Spoke–hub distribution paradigm.

In Hyderabad Metro, 40 per cent of the retail space was sold even before the metro stations were built to generate non-fare revenue. L&TMRHL built real- estate projects like Next Galleria malls in Panjagutta, Irrum Manzil, Hitech City and Musarambagh with skywalks, for generating non-fare revenues under Transit-oriented development (TOD).  In 2019, Hyderabad Metro started a semi-naming policy of metro stations, awarded through an open e-tendering process, to generate non-fare revenues.

Depots 
Hyderabad Metro currently has 2 operational depots. Miyapur and Uppal depot land is 100 acres each. The proposed Falaknuma depot will be constructed in 17 acres.

Ridership

The Metro has opened to overwhelming response, with over 200,000 people using it on Day 1. On the first Sunday of operations, the Metro was used by 240,000 people. As of 2020, the daily ridership is about 490,000. Although there was hiccups in the beginning of operations in 2017 with meager ridership of  100,000 per day, opening the new lines to LB Nagar and Hi-Tech city in 2018–19, ridership has surged and reached milestones from 2 to 4 lakhs in very short duration.

Trains are initially being operated at a frequency of 3 minutes in very peak hours and every 5 minutes in peak hours (between Miyapur-LB Nagar) and 4 minutes in peak hours (between Hi-Tec City/ Ameerpet-Nagole), though maximum achievable frequency is every 90 seconds. Similarly, three-car trains are being used currently, though it is planned to use six-car trains in the future.

In December 2017, Hyderabad Metro Rail launched its mobile app, TSavaari. Hyderabad Metro timings are available on T-Savari app. Ola Cabs and Uber tied up its services with app. 

In May 2022, Hyderabad Metro Managing Director N.V.S. Reddy ruled out possibility of attaching one single or double coach to three-coach train sets. Each three-coach train can take between 900-1,000 passengers per trip and the project has been envisaged in such a manner that another three-coach set rake can be attached to make them into six-coach trains with the stations/depots too already planned for the increased length of the trains. L&T Metro Rail has been using 53 train sets of three coaches each with four three-coach sets under repair or maintenance undertaken using special software based on Internet of Things. Hyderabad Metro Rail crossed 100 million cumulative ridership milestone in just 671 days. In February 2023, Hyderabad Metro announced that Folding cycles are allowed on Metro, which are of the size of a 40kg bag, but only during non-peak hours.

Last-mile connectivity
In order to enhance first and last mile connectivity of Hyderabad Metro Rail, Svida Mobility Pvt Ltd, an urban mobility services startup signed a Memorandum of Understanding (MoU) with the L&T Metro Rail Hyderabad Limited (L&TMRHL) with plans to scale up their feeder vehicle services. Svida offers services via a robust AI-enabled tech platform, which provides the booking of feeder vehicles. Svida Mobility Pvt Ltd is L&TMRHL authorised feeder service provider since 2019. The first and last mile connectivity routes, across seven metro stations - Raidurg, Parade ground, Mettuguda, LB Nagar, Uppal, KPHB and Miyapur- use e-Autos and Tata wingers. On 21 April 2022, Hyderabad metro launched its electric auto services in collaboration with AI-enabled ride-hailing mobility platform MetroRide. The services were launched at two metro stations - Parade Grounds and Raidurg Stations.

Cost
The State Government decided to bear 10% of it, while L&T was to bear the remaining 90% of the cost. The construction work which was supposed to commence on 3 March 2011 commenced in 2012.

Infrastructure

The 71.3 km standard-gauge network will feature ballastless track throughout and will be electrified at 25 kV AC 50 Hz. An operations control centre and depot are constructed at Uppal. At some places,  a flyover, underpass and metro has been constructed at the same place, as part of Strategic road development plan (SRDP).

CBTC Technology

At the end of 2012, L&T Metro Rail awarded Thales a 7.4 billion ($US 134m) contract to provide CBTC and integrated telecommunications and supervision systems on all three lines. Thales Group supplied its SelTrac Communications-based train control (CBTC) technology, and trains initially run in automatic train operation mode with minimum headways of 90 seconds, although the system will support eventual migration to unattended train operation (UTO).

Rolling stock
On 12 September 2012, Larsen and Toubro Metro Rail Hyderabad Ltd (LTMRHL) announced that it has awarded tender for supply of rolling stock to Hyundai Rotem. The  tender is for 57 trains consisting of 171 cars which will be delivered in phases at least 9 months before the commencement of each stage. On 2 October 2013, LTMRHL unveiled its train car for Hyderabad Metro. A model coach which is half the size of the actual coach, was on public display at Necklace Road on the banks of Hussain Sagar in the heart of Hyderabad. The trains will be 3.2m wide and 4m high. There will be 4 doors on each side of each coach.

On 10 April 2014, the first metro train for HMR rolled out of Hyundai Rotem factory at Changwon in South Korea and reached Hyderabad in May 2014. On 31 December 2014, Hyderabad Metro Rail successfully conducted a training run in Automatic Train Operation (ATO) mode for the first time between Nagole and Mettuguda. In February 2022, Hyderabad Metro became India's first metro rail to introduce ozone-based sanitisation of its train coaches.

Ticketing and recharge
The L&T Hyderabad project has an automated ticketing system with features such as contactless smart card based ticketing, slim automatic gates, payment by cash and credit/debit card, passenger operated ticket vending machine and provision of common ticketing system. It also have a provision of NFC-based technology to enable usage of mobile phones as fare media and high performance machine to avoid long queues. Hyderabad Metro Rail smart card acts as a virtual wallet that facilitates seamless travel. A smart card can be purchased from a ticketing office at any Hyderabad Metro station or through TSavaari App. A smart card can be recharged for a minimum amount of  50 and maximum amount of  3000. The smart card can be recharged through TSavaari App, HMR Passenger website (www.ltmetro.com), or Paytm App. There is 10% discount on all trips made through smart card. In December 2019, Hyderabad Metro started cashless QR (Quick Response) code payment option for e-tickets through MakeMyTrip and Goibibo. In October 2022, Hyderabad Metro became the first Metro rail in the country to launch an end-to-end fully digital payment-enabled Metro ticket booking through the WhatsApp e-ticketing facility.

Samsung Data Systems India, a subsidiary of South Korean firm Samsung, has been awarded the automatic fare collection system package for the L&T metro rail project. The package involves design, manufacture, supply, installation, testing and commissioning of the system. Official ticket prices were announced on 25 November 2017. The base fare is 10 for up to 2 km.

Awards and nominations

The HMR project was showcased as one of the top 100 strategic global infrastructure projects at the Global Infrastructure Leadership Forum held in New York during February–March 2013.

L&T Metro Rail Hyderabad Limited (LTMRHL) was conferred the SAP ACE Award 2015 in the 'Strategic HR and Talent Management' category.

In 2018 the Rasoolpura, Paradise and Prakash Nagar Metro stations were awarded the Indian Green Building Council's (IGBC) Green MRTS Platinum Award.

Hyderabad Metro was adjudged as the Best Urban Mass Transit Project by the Government of India in November 2018.

In October 2022, three metro stations of Hyderabad Metro- Durgam Cheruvu , Punjagutta and LB Nagar were awarded Indian Green Building Council (IGBC) Green MRTS Certification with the highest platinum rating under elevated stations category. With this, Hyderabad Metro Rail has 23 metro stations certified with the IGBC Platinum rating.

In popular culture
 2018 Telugu film Devadas starring Nani and Rashmika Mandanna, was the first film to be shot in Hyderabad Metro.
 Some scenes of 2021 Telugu films- Vakeel Saab starring Pawan Kalyan and Nivetha Thomas and Ek Mini Katha starring Santosh Shoban and Kavya Thapar were also shot in Hyderabad Metro.
 In June 2022, a scene from  upcoming Indian science fiction film starring Amitabh Bachchan was shot at Raidurg metro station.

Network Map

See also
 Transport in Hyderabad
 Hyderabad Multi-Modal Transport System
 MRT (Bangkok)
 Rajiv Gandhi International Airport

References

External links

Hyderabad Metro Rail Ltd

 
Keolis
Transport in Hyderabad, India
Rail transport in Telangana
Standard gauge railways in India
2017 establishments in Telangana